Ignacio Cáceres (born 18 June 1976) is a Spanish long-distance runner who specializes in the 10,000 metres, half marathon and marathon. He lives in L’Estartit,Girona, Spain

He was the silver medallist in the 10,000 m at the 2001 Summer Universiade and the following year he finished twelfth in the event at the 2002 European Championships. He was selected for the marathon team at the 2010 European Athletics Championships, but failed to finish the race.

He set a personal best at the 2012 Rotterdam Marathon, taking ninth place in a time of 2:11:58 hours.  Also in 2012, he competed in the marathon at the Olympic Games, finishing in 31st place.

International competitions

Personal bests
3000 metres - 7:57.58 min (2004)
5000 metres - 13:25.11 min (2004) 
10,000 metres - 28:19.42 min (2002)
Half marathon - 1:02:47 hrs (2007)
Marathon - 2:11:58 hrs (2012)

References

1976 births
Living people
People from Baix Llobregat
Sportspeople from the Province of Barcelona
Spanish male long-distance runners
Spanish male marathon runners
Olympic athletes of Spain
Athletes (track and field) at the 2012 Summer Olympics
Universiade medalists in athletics (track and field)
Universiade silver medalists for Spain
Medalists at the 2001 Summer Universiade